Nice Shootin' Cowboy is a 2008 Australian drama/western short subject written and directed by Ben Phelps and produced by John Maynard, it is based on the story by Anson Cameron.

Cast
André De Vanny as Will
Simon Stone as Cormac
Jack Wardana as Alf
Rebecca Hetherington as Zara
Don Bridges as male buyer
Kym Troutbeck as female buyer

External links
 Official website
 

Australian drama short films
2008 films
2008 Western (genre) films
Australian Western (genre) films
2000s English-language films
2000s Australian films